Nessaea hewitsonii, the Hewitson's olivewing, is a species of butterfly of the family Nymphalidae. It is common in a broad range of the Amazon basin including the eastern slopes of the Andes mountain range. It is found in high evergreen tropical forest, semi-deciduous tropical forest, and riverine forest.

The length of the wings is 33–40 mm for males and 36–41 mm for females. The upperside of the males is dark brown, with bright sky-blue diagonal bands on the forewings and blue markings on the hindwings.

They are fast flyers and fly in an erratic fashion. They may land suddenly on leaves or on the ground if decaying fruit is present. They are also attracted to human perspiration.

Subspecies
Nessaea hewitsonii hewitsonii (from Colombia, Ecuador and Peru eastward into the Amazon valley, and south to Rondonia, Brazil)
Nessaea hewitsonii boliviensis Jenkins, 1989 (Bolivia and southern Peru)

References

Biblidinae
Fauna of Brazil
Nymphalidae of South America
Butterflies described in 1859